Takanyó Valley is a valley between Hosszúhetény and Komló (Zobákpuszta) at the Northern part of Hármashegy, in the Eastern Mecsek. Mecsek, Hungary.

Spring of Stream Völgység, main watercourse of the Eastern Mecsek is just above the valley.

Springs

Spring Csengő
Spring Takanyó

Fauna
There are some highly protected bird species which hatch their nests here.

Sources

External links
Fotó

Landforms of Hungary
Valleys of Europe